Peter Jay (born 7 February 1937) is an English economist, broadcaster and former diplomat.

Personal life
Peter Jay is the son of Douglas Jay, Baron Jay, and Peggy Jay, both of whom were Labour Party politicians. He was educated at The Dragon School, Oxford (the alma mater of several senior Labour politicians, including Hugh Gaitskell), followed by Winchester College (where he was Senior Commoner Prefect) and Christ Church, Oxford, where he graduated with a first-class honours degree in PPE. In Trinity Term 1960, he was president of the Oxford Union. He was commissioned in the Royal Navy, then worked as a civil servant at HM Treasury before becoming a journalist and, for 10 years, economics editor with The Times.

Jay married Margaret Callaghan, the daughter of Labour politician James Callaghan, in 1961. In 1977, when his father-in-law had become Prime Minister, Jay was appointed to the post of Ambassador to the United States by the Foreign Secretary, his friend David Owen. As Jay was just 40 years old, was not a diplomat and had never held any public office, this appointment caused some controversy and accusations of nepotism.

In 1986, Jay married his second wife, Emma Bettina, daughter of the museum curator and writer Peter Thornton. He has seven children.

Career
In the early 1970s, Jay became the principal presenter of the London Weekend Television Sunday news analysis programme Weekend World. He co-authored, with his friend John Birt, a series of articles for The Times in 1972, in which they criticised standard television journalism and developed what came to be called their "mission to explain".

As leader of a consortium of high-profile media figures, including Angela Rippon, David Frost, Michael Parkinson and Anna Ford, Jay won the franchise and became the founding chairman of TV-am, a breakfast TV station launched by the consortium. When the initial focus on news and current affairs did not yield economic success, he was fired by his friend and co-director Jonathan Aitken.

Jay's career took a surprising turn when he became Chief of Staff to Robert Maxwell during Maxwell's most high-profile years. Jay's wife Margaret led Maxwell's Aids Foundation around the same time, where she met her present husband Professor Mike Adler.

Jay later returned to broadcast journalism; John Birt appointed him Economics Editor of the BBC, and Jay presented editions of The Money Programme.
 
He wrote The Road to Riches or the Wealth of Man (2000, Weidenfeld & Nicolson), presented a related BBC TV documentary series, and also co-wrote, with Michael Stewart, the speculative historical novel Apocalypse 2000: Economic Breakdown and the Suicide of Democracy (1987).

While his father was closely linked with Keynesian economics, Jay increasingly identified himself with the new "monetarian" school associated with Milton Friedman, a man with whom he was close friends. Jay has also debated with Friedman and Thomas Sowell, including two episodes of Friedman's TV series Free to Choose (1980). Jay was also the moderator of the discussions in the British version of Free to Choose. Jay was credited with helping write James Callaghan's speech at the 1976 Labour Party Conference. The speech is seen as something of a turning point, with Callaghan declaring: "We used to think that you could spend your way out of a recession, and increase employment by cutting taxes and boosting Government spending. I tell you in all candour that that option no longer exists", a rejection of the previously dominant Keynesian logic and a reflection of the ascendency of Monetarism. Jay used his column in The Times to advocate for neoliberal policies in Britain.

Between June 2003 and May 2009, Jay was a non-executive director of the Bank of England. He was a governor of the Ditchley Foundation from 1982 until 1987, and was formerly a councillor on Woodstock Town Council.

References

External links
The Papers of Peter Jay at the Churchill Archives Centre
Interview with Noam Chomsky on Anarcho-Syndicalism
Debate between Jay, Milton Friedman, and Thomas Sowell

1937 births
Alumni of Christ Church, Oxford
Ambassadors of the United Kingdom to the United States
BBC newsreaders and journalists
BBC television presenters
British economists
British male journalists
Civil servants in HM Treasury
Councillors in Oxfordshire
Living people
People educated at The Dragon School
People educated at Winchester College
Presidents of the Oxford Union
Royal Navy officers
Sons of life peers
Spouses of life peers
The Times people